The Shire of Kara Kara was a local government area about  northwest of Melbourne, the state capital of Victoria, Australia.

History

Kara Kara was first incorporated as the St Arnaud Road District on 25 June 1861, which became a shire on 14 November 1864. It was renamed as Kara Kara on 20 October 1884.

On 20 January 1995, the Shire of Kara Kara was abolished, and along with the City of Stawell, the Town of St Arnaud, and parts of the Shires of Ararat, Avoca, Donald, Dunmunkle, Stawell and the Grampians National Park section of the Shire of Wimmera, was merged into the newly created Shire of Northern Grampians. The Cope Cope district was transferred to the newly created Shire of Buloke.

Wards

The Shire of Kara Kara was divided into three ridings, each of which elected three councillors:
 South Riding
 East Riding
 West Riding

Towns and localities
 Avon Plains
 Beazleys Bridge
 Carapooee
 Coonooer West
 Cope Cope
 Emu
 Gooroc
 Gowar East
 Gre Gre
 Kooreh
 Moolerr
 Paradise
 Rostron
 Slaty Creek
 Stuart Mill
 St Arnaud North
 Sutherland
 Swanwater
 Tottington
 Traynors Lagoon
 Winjallok

Population

* Estimate in the 1958 Victorian Year Book.

References

External links
 Victorian Places - Kara Kara Shire

Kara Kara
1861 establishments in Australia